Agyneta plagiata is a species of sheet weaver found in Panama. It was described by Banks in 1929.

References

plagiata
Endemic fauna of Panama
Spiders of Central America
Spiders described in 1929